A flourish of approval or krul ("curl") is a mostly Dutch symbol used for grading schoolwork or to show that one has seen and agreed with a paragraph. The krul first appeared in the early 19th century together with the rising bureaucracy in the Netherlands. The symbol is rarely used outside of the Netherlands apart from the Dutch Caribbean islands and former Dutch colonies such as Indonesia, South Africa, Suriname.

Despite its wide usage throughout the country and its former colonies, as of March 2020 there is no Unicode symbol for it. Similar to a dele it may be substituted with the German penny symbol, ₰.

See also

References

Symbols
Education in the Netherlands